The Hubert Curien Pluridisciplinary Institute (IPHC—) is a joint research unit (UMR—) of the French Centre national de la recherche scientifique (CNRS) and of the University of Strasbourg. It was formed by the voluntary association of three research laboratories at the University of Strasbourg.

History 

The following were the laboratories that joined together to form the IPHC on January 1, 2006:

 Institut de Recherches Subatomiques (IReS)
 Centre d'Écologie et Physiologie Énergétiques (CEPE)
 Laboratoire des Sciences Analytiques et Interactions Ioniques Moléculaires et Biomoléculaires
 
The institute is named after Hubert Curien.

See also 
Institute for Physics and Chemistry of Materials in Strasbourg
Institut Charles Sadron

References

External links 
  

University of Strasbourg